The Unified Tertiary Matriculation Examination is a computer-based standardized examination for prospective undergraduates in Nigeria. It is designed to assess problem solving, critical thinking, knowledge of scientific concepts and principles significance of each subject taken. Prior to 2014 the exam was a paper-and-pencil test; since May 17, 2014, however, all administrations of the exam have been computer-based.

Policies
Registration is usually once in a year, and candidates are allowed to register in four subjects. The use of English is compulsory and any other three subjects relevant to the proposed course of study as set out in the relevant chapters of the Joint Admissions and Matriculation Board Unified Tertiary Matriculation Examination brochure.

The board prohibits the use of calculators, timers, or other electronic devices during the exam. Cellular phones are also strictly prohibited from exam rooms and individuals found to possess them are penalised, usually made to forfeit the exam. The only item that may be brought into the testing room is the candidate's Reprinted E-registration slip.
Exam results are made available just few days after the exam has been conducted via board's website, SMS and email. The board also sends scores to universities and institutions being applied to.

Preparation
The Joint Admissions and Matriculation Board does not prepare candidates for its examination by establishing secondary schools or tutorial centers, and no such institution is affiliated with the body.

However, the board provides a syllabus brochure, which is either made available online or given to students when they register. Candidates are expected to cover all the subject areas in the syllabus.

The board also has an online practice test on its website which enables students to practice. There are also some test software and applications which are made by several test preparatory companies, none of which are affiliated with the board.

Students also purchase books that contain questions asked in the exam during previous years. The book is made by different publishing companies.

References

Standardized tests